Victor Fred Moore (February 24, 1876 – July 23, 1962) was an American actor of stage and screen, a major Broadway star from the late 1920s through the 1930s. He was also a writer and director, but is best remembered today as a comedian, playing timid, mild-mannered roles. Today's audiences know him as the star of a Christmas-themed movie that has become a perennial: It Happened on 5th Avenue (1947). Moore plays a vagrant who occupies a millionaire's mansion—without the millionaire's knowledge—while the owner is vacationing.

Career
Victor Moore appeared in 21 Broadway shows and more than 50 films. His first appearance on Broadway was in Rosemary (1896). He also appeared in George M. Cohan's Forty-five Minutes from Broadway, which opened January 1, 1906, and its sequel, The Talk of New York (1907). He went on to star in shows such as Oh, Kay! (1926) as Shorty McGee, Hold Everything! (1928) as Nosey Bartlett, Gershwin's Of Thee I Sing (1931) as Vice-president Alexander Throttlebottom, Let 'Em Eat Cake (1933), Cole Porter's Anything Goes (1934) as Moonface Martin, and Irving Berlin's Louisiana Purchase (1940) as Senator Oliver P. Loganberry. Moore often appeared with actor William Gaxton, with Gaxton's self-assured slicker playing opposite Moore's worried friend.

Moore's talent was first recognized by screenwriter Beatrice deMille. He made his film debut in 1915. He starred in three films that year, two of which were directed by Cecil B. DeMille – Chimmie Fadden and Chimmie Fadden Out West. He also appeared in Swing Time (1936) with Fred Astaire and Ginger Rogers, Make Way for Tomorrow (1937), The Heat's On with Mae West, Duffy's Tavern (1945), Ziegfeld Follies (1946), On Our Merry Way (1948), A Kiss in the Dark (1949), and We're Not Married (1952), working with Ginger Rogers for a second time. His last screen appearance was a role as a plumber in The Seven Year Itch (1955).

He worked in film twice with Bob Hope, first in Louisiana Purchase (1941) and again in Star Spangled Rhythm (1942). In the film Ziegfeld Follies (1946), Moore enacted the famous "Pay the Two Dollars" sketch (in which Moore is arrested on a minor charge, only to have his lawyer steamroll the case into higher courts). Edward Arnold played the William Gaxton lawyer role.

Moore made a guest appearance as himself on The Martin and Lewis radio show on August 16, 1949, and was a regular (as himself) on The Jimmy Durante Show.

In 1945, Moore appeared in the Daffy Duck cartoon Ain't That Ducky. He was so pleased with his caricature he offered to add his voice free of charge—on the condition that the animators draw him with a little more hair.

Moore also appeared on television on such shows as The Colgate Comedy Hour and So This Is Hollywood along side former child star Mitzi Green.

Personal life
He was married twice – first to actress Emma Littlefield from June 23, 1903, until her death on June 23, 1934, and then to Shirley Paige on January 16, 1942, when Moore was 65 and Paige was 20. The marriage was not publicly announced for a year and a half. They remained married until Victor Moore's death 20 years later.

He had three children with his first wife: an adopted son Victor, Jr., Ora Victora, and Robert Emmett.

Victor Moore was well liked by his colleagues. In 1915, among the actors' colony in Long Island, New York, he established a social group called L.I.G.H.T.S. (Long Island Good Hearted Thespian's Society), based in Freeport. The membership included many show-business notables, including John Philip Sousa, Irving Berlin, Al Jolson, Will Rogers, and the Ringling Bros. Moore noted that people in show business often had to work during the Christmas season, so he instituted annual "Christmas in July" celebrations especially for actors.

Moore died of a heart attack on July 23, 1962. He was 86 years old. He is interred at Cypress Hills Cemetery in Brooklyn, New York, United States.

Legacy
The Victor Moore Bus Terminal and business arcade at the New York City Subway's Roosevelt Avenue / 74th Street station in Jackson Heights, Queens was named for him when it opened in 1941. In 2005, the arcade was replaced by an Intermodal Transportation Complex serving the same subway and bus lines.

Filmography

Silent films
Snobs (1915) as Henry Disney
Chimmie Fadden (1915, Short) as Chimmie Fadden
Chimmie Fadden Out West (1915) as Chimmie Fadden
The Race (1916) as Jimmy Grayson Jr.
The Clown (1916) as Piffle
The Best Man (1916, Short)
In Society and Out (1916, Short)
He Meant Well (1917, Short)
Did It Ever Happen to You? (1917, Short) as Vic
The Sleepwalker (1917, Short) as Vic
He Got There After All (1917, Short) as Vic
Some Doctor (1917, Short)
His Military Figure (1917, Short)
Ballad and Bologna (1917, Short)
Invited Out (1917, Short)
Moving (1917, Short)
Flivvering (1917, Short)
Community (1917, Short)
Bungalowing (1917 short)
Oh, Pop! (1917, Short)
Camping (1917, Short)
In Bed-In Bad (1917, Short)
The Cow Jumped Over the Moon (1917 film)|The Cow Jumped Over the Moon (1917, Short)
Home Defense (1917, Short)
Faint Heart and Fair Lady (1917, Short)
Nutty Knitters (1917, Short)
Toothaches and Heartaches (1917, Short)
The Installment Plan (1917, Short)
The Wrong Mr. Fox (1917, Short) as Jimmy Fox
Oh! U-Boat (1917, Short)
Meatless Days and Sleepless Nights (1918, Short)
He Got His (1918, Short)
Adam and His Eves (1918, Short)
The Man Who Found Himself (1925) as Humpty Dumpty Smith

Sound films
Dangerous Nan McGrew (1930) as Doc Foster
Heads Up (1930) as Skippy Dugan
Love in the Suburbs (1931 short)
Ladies not Allowed (1932 short)
Romance in the Rain (1934) as J. Franklyn Blank
Gift of Gab (1934) as Colonel Horatios Trivers
Swing Time (1936) as Pop Cardetti
Gold Diggers of 1937 (1936) as J.J. Hobart
We're on the Jury (1937) as Mr. J. Clarence 'Pudgy' Beaver
Make Way for Tomorrow (1937) as Barkley Cooper
Meet the Missus (1937) as Otis Foster
The Life of the Party (1937) as Oliver
She's Got Everything (1937) as Waldo Eddington
Radio City Revels (1938) as Paul Plummer
This Marriage Business (1938) as Jud Parker
Louisiana Purchase (1941) as Sen. Oliver P. Loganberry
Star Spangled Rhythm (1942) as William "Bronco Billy" Webster
This Is the Army (1943) as Soldier's Father (uncredited)
Riding High (1943) as Mortimer J. Slocum
The Heat's On (1943) as Hubert Bainbridge
True to Life (1943) as Pop Porter
Carolina Blues (1944) as Phineas / Elliott / Hiriam / Horatio / Aunt Martha / Aunt Minerva Carver
It's in the Bag! (1945) as Himself
Ain't That Ducky (1945 short) as Hunter (uncredited voice)
Ziegfeld Follies (1945) as Lawyer's Client ('Pay the Two Dollars')
Duffy's Tavern (1945) as Michael O'Malley
It Happened on 5th Avenue (1947) as Aloysius T. McKeever
On Our Merry Way (1948) as Ashton Carrington
A Kiss in the Dark (1949) as Horace Willoughby
We're Not Married! (1952) as Justice of the Peace Melvin Bush
The Seven Year Itch (1955) as Plumber (final film role)

Radio appearances

References

External links

 
 
 
 Victor Moore papers, 1864–1958 [bulk 1890s–1958] Billy Rose Theatre Division, The New York Public Library.

1876 births
1962 deaths
19th-century American male actors
20th-century American comedians
20th-century American male actors
American directors
American male comedians
American male film actors
American male radio actors
American male silent film actors
American male stage actors
American male television actors
American male voice actors
Burials at Cypress Hills Cemetery
People from Hammonton, New Jersey
Vaudeville performers
19th-century American comedians